Two ships of the Royal Navy have been named HMS Myngs, after Admiral Sir Christopher Myngs:

  was an  launched in 1914 and sold in 1921.
  was a Z-class destroyer flotilla leader launched in 1943 and sold to the Egyptian Navy in 1955. She was renamed El Qaher in 1956 and was sunk by Israeli aircraft in 1970.

References

Royal Navy ship names